All Woman  is a 1918 American comedy film directed by Hobart Henley and starring Mae Marsh and Jere Austin. It is not known whether the film currently survives.  Debut film of Warner Baxter

Plot
As described in a film magazine, Susan Sweeney (Marsh), employed in a doll factory, learns that she has inherited a hotel in a small town in the Adirondacks. Picturing the hotel as resembling the most palatial building she has ever seen, she and two girl friends set out for the new home. Consternation reigns supreme when the young women are taken to a ramshackle building, one-half vacant and the other half decorated with persons in various stages of inebriation. The sight of two motherless children prompts Sue to remain and before long she has transferred the place into a fairly decent hotel. She is able to put the bar out of business, reforms the village drunkard, plays Cupid, and wins the love of Austin Strong (Austin).

Cast
Mae Marsh as Susan Sweeney
Jere Austin as Austin Strong
Arthur Housman as Dick Wellman
John St. Polis as Sam Tupper
John T. Dillon as William Kibby
Joe Henaway as Hodges
Hazel Alden as Miriam Strong
Madelyn Clare as Millie
Elsie Sothern as Agnes
Lois Alexander as Amy
Dan Mason as Cabdriver
Jules Cowles as Alcoholic
Alvina Alstadt as Motherless Child
Warner Baxter (uncredited)

References

External links

Delano, Edith Barnard (1916), When Carey Came to Town, New York: Dodd, Mead & Company, on the Internet Archive

1918 films
Silent American comedy films
1918 comedy films
Films set in country houses
Films set in hotels
Goldwyn Pictures films
Films directed by Hobart Henley
American black-and-white films
American silent feature films
1910s American films